David Justin Young (2 May 1949 – 31 August 2022) was an English musician, record producer and sound engineer best known for his playing with the John Cale Band in the 1980s and collaborating with the German band Element of Crime for 35 years.

Career 
Young started his career in the 1970s. He was one of the three sound engineers on David Bowie's Diamond Dogs North American Tour in 1974. He also worked with Duke Ellington.

In 1982, he started working with John Cale, initially as a sound engineer (along with David Lichtenstein) on what would become the Music for a New Society album. He also plays guitar on some songs and joined his live band as a full member soon after. He then played on two more studio albums, Caribbean Sunset (1984) and Artificial Intelligence (1985), the latter of which he also co-produced, as well as two live albums, Comes Alive (1984) and Live at Rockpalast (recorded 1984, released 2010). He stayed with Cale's band until the end of 1985, in the later period (after Ollie Halsall joined) switching from guitar to bass. Although he left Cale's live band, they continued to work together in the studio. In 1987, Young produced and engineered some Happy Mondays recordings (including "24 Hour Party People" and "Wah Wah (Think Tank)") off their debut album, mainly produced by Cale.

In 1987, he engineered the Cale-produced second album by the German rock band Element of Crime called . From the beginning of the 1990s he also played with them live as a guitarist and in 2002 he joined them as a regular bassist. He left the band due to ill health in June 2022, just a few months before he died, and was replaced by Markus Runzheimer.

Young died on 31 August 2022 in a hospital in England at the age of 73.

References

External links 

English rock guitarists
English record producers
English audio engineers
Musicians from London
1949 births
2022 deaths